The Dictionnaire infernal is a book on demonology, describing demons organised in hierarchies. It was written by Jacques Collin de Plancy and first published in 1818. There were several editions of the book; perhaps the most famous is the 1863 edition, which included sixty-nine illustrations by Louis Le Breton depicting the appearances of several of the demons. Many but not all of these images were later used in S. L. MacGregor Mathers's edition of The Lesser Key of Solomon.

History
Dictionnaire Infernal was first published in 1818 and then divided into two volumes, with six reprints—and many changes—between 1818 and 1863. This book attempts to provide an account of all the knowledge concerning superstitions and demonology.

A review in 1822 read: 

The cover page for the 1826 edition reads:

Influenced by Voltaire, Collin de Plancy initially did not believe in superstition. For example, the book reassures its contemporaries as to the torments of Hell: "To deny that there are sorrows and rewards after death is to deny the existence of God; since God exists, it must be necessarily so. But only God could know the punishments meted out to the guilty, or the place that holds them.  All the catalogues made herebefore are only the fruit of a more or less disordered imagination. Theologians should leave to the poets the depiction of Hell, and not themselves seek to frighten minds with hideous paintings and appalling books" (p. 164).

The skepticism of Collin de Plancy increasingly subsided over time. By the end of 1830 he was an enthusiastic Roman Catholic, to the consternation of his former admirers. In later years, De Plancy rejected and modified his past works, thoroughly revising his Dictionnaire Infernal to conform with Roman Catholic theology. This influence is most clearly seen in the sixth and final 1863 edition of the book, which is decorated with many engravings and seeks to affirm the existence of the demons. de Plancy collaborated with Jacques Paul Migne, a French priest, to complete a Dictionary of the occult sciences or theological Encyclopaedia, which is described as an authentic Roman Catholic work.

Many articles written in the Dictionnaire Infernal illustrate the author's vacillation between rationalism, faith, and willingness to believe without evidence. For example, he admits the possible effectiveness of chiromancy, while rejecting cartomancy: "It is certain that chiromancy, and especially physiognomy, have at least some plausibility: they draw their predictions from signs which relate to features which distinguish and characterize people; of lines which the subjects carry with themselves, which are the work of nature, and that someone can believe significant, since they are unique to each individual. But the cards, merely human artifacts, not knowing either the future, nor the present, nor the past, have nothing of the individuality of the person consulting them. For a thousand different people they will have the same result; and consulted twenty times about the same subject, they will produce twenty contradictory productions" (p. 82).

List of demons

 Abbadon/Apollyon
 Abigor also known as Eligos
 Abraxas/Abracas
 Adramelech
 Aguares
 Alastor
 Alocer
 Amduscias
 Amon
 Andras
 Asmodee
 Astaroth
 Azazel
 Bael
 Balan
 Barbatos
 Behemoth
 Beleth
 Belphegor
 Belzebuth
 Berith
 Bhairava/Beyrevra
 Buer
 Caacrinolaas
 Cali
 Caym
 Cerbere
 Deimos/Deumus
 Eurynome
 Flaga
 Flavros
 Forcas
 Furfur
 Ganga/Gramma
 Garuda
 Guayota
 Gomory
 Haborym
 Ipes
 Lamia
 Lechies
 Leonard
 Lucifer
 Malphas
 Mammon
 Marchosias
 Melchom
 Moloch
 Nickar
 Nybbas
 Orobas
 Paimon
 Picollus
 Pruflas/Busas
 Rahovart
 Ribesal
 Ronwe
 Scox
 Stolas
 Tap
 Torngarsuk
 Ukobach
 Volac
 Wall
 Xaphan
 Yan-gant-y-tan
 Zaebos

Early editions
Contents of the Dictionaire Infernal varied across different early imprints:
 1818: first edition
 1825: second edition
 1826: reprint of second edition
 1844: third edition
 1845: fourth edition
 1853: fifth edition
 1863: sixth edition, illustrated by Louis le Breton

See also
 Classification of demons

References

External links

 Dictionnaire infernal, ou, Recherches et anecdotes, sur les démons, les, 1818 at Google Books, PDF download available
    Dictionnaire infernal, ou Recherches et anecdotes sur les démons, 1844 at Google Books, PDF download available
 Dictionnaire des sciences occultes: ou, Répertoire universel des êtres, des, 1848 at Google Books, PDF download available
  Dictionnaire infernal: ou Répertoire universel des êtres, des personnages, 1853 582 pages – at Google Books PDF download available
 Dictionnaire infernal: ou Répertoire universel des êtres, des personnages, 1863 PDF download available.
 Deliriums Realm – Dictionnaire Infernal
 Boards of the edition of 1826  on the site of the electronic library of Lisieux

1818 non-fiction books
Demons
Demonological literature
Occult books
Catholic engraving